Trevor Large (born June 8, 1980) is a Canadian former ice hockey player who currently the head coach at Canisius.

Career
Large played his college hockey at Ferris State for the "legendary" Bob Daniels. He played for years for the Bulldogs and was part of the programs first ever NCAA tournament appearance in 2002–03. After graduating with a degree in computer information systems Large returned to the college ranks in 2006 simultaneously earning his MBA and serving as an assistant coach at American International. Once his graduate career was completed he moved to West Point to become an assistant with Army's hockey team. He served in that capacity for six seasons before moving across-state to Buffalo to become an assistant coach for Canisius under Dave Smith. Large remained at that post until Smith left to accept the top job at Rensselaer and less than a month later was named as Smith's replacement.

Head coaching record

References

External links

1980 births
Canadian ice hockey forwards
Ferris State Bulldogs men's ice hockey players
Canisius Golden Griffins men's ice hockey coaches
Living people
Sportspeople from Brampton
Ice hockey people from Ontario